Aahat – Ek Ajib Kahani, shortly called Aahat, is a 2010 Bollywood film directed by Kishore Rege and produced by Vishal. Although shot in 1971 and was ready to release in 1974, it was released on 26 February 2010. According to Salim Jafer, the distributor of the film in India, he refused to state exactly why it was never released but asserted that "at first there were all sorts of problems and then the producer of the movie, Franklin Fernandes died."

Plot
The story is about a rich, confident, blind young woman married to a photographer. After a necklace is stolen they encounter the villain.

Cast
Vinod Mehra as Rajesh
Jaya Bachchan as Jaya
Shreeram Lagoo
Sulochana Chatterjee
Bindu as Rita
Amrish Puri

Music
The music was by Chetan and lyrics were by Kafil Azhar.

Release
Over 200 prints of the film were distributed around India. It was screened at the Liberty Cinema in Fort, Shradha in Dadar and Amar in Chembur.

References

2010s Hindi-language films
2010 films